Jonathan Russell Fritz, formerly known as Jonny Corndawg, is an American alternative country musician who was born in Missoula, Montana. He has released four albums, two under the name "Jonny Corndawg" and two as "Jonny Fritz".

Career
In 2008, Fritz (then known as Jonny Corndawg) released his debut album, I’m Not Ready To Be a Daddy. In 2010, Fritz released a 7" with Deer Tick on Partisan Records, of which only 500 copies were made. He released his second album, Down on the Bikini Line, on August 30, 2011 in the United States on the Nasty Memories label. In 2012, Fritz stated that he wanted to be called "Jonny Fritz," his birth name, rather than Jonny Corndawg, as he had previously been known. He has said that he made this decision in part based on advice from record label executives, and because he did not want people to know what to expect from his music based on his name.

In 2013, Fritz released Dad Country, his third album overall and his first under the name "Jonny Fritz", on ATO Records. It was recorded at Jackson Browne's studio in Los Angeles, and was produced by Taylor Goldsmith of Dawes. It was followed by the release of the album's single "Goodbye Summer", for which a music video was also made.

Critical reception
Down on the Bikini Line received a B− grade from both the A.V. Club and Consequence of Sound. In the A.V. Club, Steven Hyden wrote that the album's songs were "faithful and tuneful genre exercises," and in Consequence of Sound, Alex Young wrote that Corndawg displays "a preternatural grasp of honky-tonk, bluegrass, traditional, and outlaw country music" on the album. However, Young also said that the album's lyrics "can still sometimes be read as insulting".

According to Metacritic, Dad Country received generally favorable reviews from critics. Hal Horowitz reviewed Dad Country for American Songwriter and gave it 3.5 out of 5 stars. In his review, Horowitz wrote that "brevity works to Fritz’s advantage" on the album and concluded that the music on Dad Country was "some of [Fritz's] best".

Fritz released his fourth studio album, Sweet Creep, October 14, 2016. Rolling Stone named the album #14 in their 40 best country records of 2016.

Notable performances
Fritz performed at SXSW in 2012 and 2014.

Discography

References

Year of birth missing (living people)
Living people
American alternative country singers
American country singer-songwriters
ATO Records artists
Singers from Montana
Songwriters from Montana